Diana Mason may refer to:

 Diana Mason (doctor) (1922–2007), New Zealand doctor
 Diana Mason (equestrian) (1933–2016), British Olympic equestrian